In enzymology, a [3-methyl-2-oxobutanoate dehydrogenase (acetyl-transferring)] is an enzyme that catalyzes the chemical reaction

ATP + [3-methyl-2-oxobutanoate dehydrogenase (acetyl-transferring)]  ADP + [3-methyl-2-oxobutanoate dehydrogenase (acetyl-transferring)] phosphate

Thus, the two substrates of this enzyme are ATP and 3-methyl-2-oxobutanoate dehydrogenase (acetyl-transferring), whereas its 3 products are ADP, 3-methyl-2-oxobutanoate dehydrogenase (acetyl-transferring), and phosphate.

This enzyme belongs to the family of transferases, specifically those transferring a phosphate group to the sidechain oxygen atom of serine or threonine residues in proteins (protein-serine/threonine kinases).  The systematic name of this enzyme class is ATP:[3-methyl-2-oxobutanoate dehydrogenase (acetyl-transferring)] phosphotransferase. Other names in common use include kinase, BCK, BCKD kinase, BCODH kinase, branched-chain alpha-ketoacid dehydrogenase kinase, branched-chain 2-oxo acid dehydrogenase kinase, branched-chain keto acid dehydrogenase kinase, branched-chain oxo acid dehydrogenase kinase (phosphorylating), and STK2.

In 2012, it was suggested that mutations in the gene which expresses this enzyme could be the cause of a rare form of autism.

References

Literature 

 
 
 
 

EC 2.7.11
Enzymes of unknown structure